Tessier is a village in the Canadian province of Saskatchewan within the Rural Municipality of Harris No. 316 and Census Division No. 12. The village is located approximately 60 km southwest of the City of Saskatoon on Highway 7.

History 
Tessier incorporated as a village on August 24, 1909.

Demographics 

See also

 List of communities in Saskatchewan
 Villages of Saskatchewan

References

Villages in Saskatchewan
Harris No. 316, Saskatchewan
Division No. 12, Saskatchewan